The Swarnajayanti Fellowship (SJ) is a research fellowship in India awarded annually by the Department of Science and Technology (India) for notable and outstanding research by young scientists, applied or fundamental, in biology, chemistry, environmental science, engineering, mathematics, medicine and physics. The prize recognizes promising young Indian academicians who are producing outstanding work that impacts research and development.

Details 

Citizens of India who are under 40 years of age, and have a proven track record may apply. The fellowship also requires that candidates have employment support from an Indian Institute of their choosing.

Prizes 
The prize is divided into six disciplines, namely:

 Chemical Sciences
 Earth and Atmospheric Sciences
 Engineering Sciences
 Mathematical Sciences
 Life Science
 Physical Sciences

Recipients 

 List of Swarnajayanti Fellows

See also 

 List of general science and technology awards

References

External links 

 
 Awardees before 2005
 Council of Scientific and Industrial Research

Civil awards and decorations of India
Indian science and technology awards
Indian awards
Council of Scientific and Industrial Research
Awards established in 1997
1997 establishments in India